Max Burghardtswieser (born 5 April 1967) is a German luger. He competed in the men's singles event at the 1988 Winter Olympics.

References

External links
 

1967 births
Living people
German male lugers
Olympic lugers of West Germany
Lugers at the 1988 Winter Olympics
People from Berchtesgaden
Sportspeople from Upper Bavaria